Carnahan High School is a high school located in St. Louis, Missouri. It is a part of St. Louis Public Schools. It is named after Mel Carnahan, the 51st Governor of Missouri who served from 1993 to 2000, when he died in a plane crash.

History 

Carnahan High School of the Future sits in Dutchtown bordered by a park, a business district and a residential area. In 2011, the school was visited by Secretary of Education Arne Duncan, Secretary of Homeland Security Janet Napolitano, and Governor Jay Nixon.

Academics 
Carnahan ranked 43rd among Missouri High Schools. The school has 3 AP Classes: AP Language and Composition, AP Literature and Composition, AP World History. CHF has also sent a team to the Global Hack VI, an international computer coding competition and one of only 3 in SLPS to do.

References 

High schools in St. Louis
Magnet schools in St. Louis
Public high schools in Missouri
Educational institutions established in 2003
2003 establishments in Missouri
Educational institutions established in 2006
2006 establishments in Missouri
Buildings and structures in St. Louis